Dom-2 ("House-2") is a Russian reality TV show created by TNT channel. In the show, the contestants' main objective is to construct a house whilst trying to find a partner in the process. Couples then compete for the house itself.

The first episode of Dom-2 was aired on May 11, 2004. It remains one of the most highly rated, profitable and longest-running reality shows on television in Russia. Dom-2 broadcasts on the TNT channel at 11 pm every day. It is hosted by Kseniya Sobchak and Kseniya Borodina.

After more than 5,500 episodes, as of July 2019, it is the longest running reality show in Russia. In December 2020, Dom-2 started to be shown in the United Kingdom when the TNT channel started to be broadcast on Freeview via Channelbox. At December 18, 2020 TNT officially announced a Dom-2 lockdown. The last episode of show came out at December 30, 2020.

The show continued to air on U channel since April 19, 2021.

Seasons
 "House-2. Love" – May 11, 2004 – November 6, 2004
 "House-2. Wintering" – November 7, 2004 – February 28, 2005
 "House-2. The First Spring" – March 1, 2005 – May 31, 2005
 "House-2. Heat" – June 1, 2005 – August 31, 2005
 "House-2. That's Love!" – September 1, 2005 – November 14, 2005
 "House-2. New Love" – November 15, 2005 – August 31, 2006
 "House-2. Fallove" – September 1, 2006 – November 30, 2006
 "House-2. About Love" – December 1, 2006 – August 31, 2007
 "House-2. Dreams Come True" – September 1, 2007 – October 31, 2007
 "House-2. City of Love" – November 1, 2007 – 2020
 "House-2. Island of Love" – November 28, 2014 – 2020
 "House-2. New Love" – April 19, 2021 – present

Man of the Year 
 unofficially 2007. Semyon Frolov, Tver, Russia (1st place; rejection of title, was given the title to Stepan Menshchikov, got the right to give immunities); Olga Nikolayeva, Penza, Russia (2nd place; she won a money); Stepan Menshchikov, Yekaterinburg, Russia (3rd place; was given the title of Semyon Frolov)
 2009. Rimma Pənciyeva, Bakı, Azerbaijan (1st place; basically voted from Azerbaijan and Ukraine); Natalya Varvina, Voljsky, Volgograd Region (2nd place, dupe of the Year; basically voted from South Volga Region); Gleb Strawberry, Vladivostok (3rd place; basically voted from Far East)
 2010. Women's Final. The finalists were only women: Natalya Varvina, Voljsky, Volgograd Region (1st place; finalist of previous competition; previous dupe of the Year; basically voted from South Volga Region of Russia); Nelli Yermolayeva, Samara (2nd place; basically voted from Uralic and Volga Region of Russia); Inna Volovicheva, Belgorod (3rd place; basically voted from Belgorod and Voronej Region)
 2011. Vlad Kadonyi, Novosibirsk (1st place; basically voted from All Russia); Inna Volovicheva, Belgorod (2nd place; finalist of previous competition; basically voted from Belgorod and Voronej Region); Yevgeniya Feofilaktova, Kirov (3rd place; basically voted from North Russia)
 2012. Liberge Kpadonou, Öfö, Bashkortostan (1st place; basically voted from Bashkortostan and French-speaking African diaspora); Yevgeniya Feofilaktova, Kirov (2nd place; finalist of previous competition; basically voted from North Russia); Serghei Pînzari, St. Petersburg (3rd place; basically voted from St. Petersburg and Leningrad Region, Moldova and Ukraine)
 2013. Men's Final. The finalists were only men: Siarhei Syčkari, Minsk, Belarus (1st place; basically voted from Belarus and Ukraine); Serghei Pînzari, St. Petersburg (2nd place; finalist of previous competition; dupe of the year; basically voted from St. Petersburg and Leningrad Region, Moldova, Romania and Ukraine); Andrei Cercassov, Milano, Italy (3rd place; website man; basically voted from Moscow and Italian Diaspora of Russia)
 2014. Controversies Tournament: Marina Afrikantova, Burgas, Bulgaria (automatically 1st place, but basically voted from Bulgaria, Balkan states, European Bulgarian diaspora and Post-Soviet Bulgarian diaspora); Aleksandr Zadoynov, Yaroslavl (DSQ); Aliyono Ustinenko, Farg'ona, Uzbekistan (DSQ in final); Siarhei Syčkari, Minsk, Belarus (previous winner; DSQ in final); Anna Kruchinina, Moscow Oblast (automatically 2nd place)
 2015. Viktorija Romanjec, Maribor, Slovenia (1st place; basically voted from the Yugoslavian Diaspora of the Russian Federation); Ricardo José Zalas García, Gijón, Asturia, Spain (2nd place; basically voted from Spain); Alexandra Gozias, Cape Town (3rd place; basically voted from German-speaking countries)

Dupe of the Year 
 2009. Natalya Varvina, Voljsky, Volgograd Region
 2010. Nadezhda Yermakova, Oryol
 2011. Irina Aleksandrovna Agibalova, Pavlovski Posad, Moscow oblast (1st place); Nelli Yermolayeva, Samara (2nd place); Margo Agibalova, Pavlovski Posad, Moscow oblast (3rd place)
 2012. Irina Aleksandrovna Agibalova, Pavlovski Posad, Moscow oblast (1st place, 2nd title); Yevgeniya Feofilaktova, Kirov (2nd place; finalist of 2012 final competition); Oksana Ryaska, St. Petersburg
 2013. Serghei Pînzari, St. Petersburg (1st place, finalist of the current final competition); Daria Pînzari, Balakovo, Saratov oblast (2nd place, wife of current title holder); Aliyono Ustinenko, Farg'ona, Uzbekistan (3rd place)
 2014. Aliyono Ustinenko, Farg'ona, Uzbekistan (1st place; disqualifying finalist of the current final comp.); Alexander Gobozov, Vladikavkaz, Ossetia (2nd place; Aliyono Ustinenko's husband); Svetlana Ustinenko , Farg'ona, Uzbekistan (3rd place; Aliyono's mother and Gobozov's mother-in-law).

Man of the Year for the Magazine (Journal) 
 2009. Nektariy Liberman, Jerusalem
 2010. Węcesław Węgrzanowski, Krasnodar
 2011. Vlad Kadonyi (Viktor Golynov), Novosibirsk (winner of this season final of the Man Year; 3rd place in the Bitva Extrasensov 'Battle of the Extrasenses; Russia's Psychics Challenge' TNT Project)
 2012. Serghei Pînzari, St. Petersburg (finalist of this season final of the Man Year)
 2013. Yekaterina Korol, Rostov-on-Don
 2014. Elina Camiren, Tumen

Man of the Year for the Official Website 
 2009. Andrei Cercassov, Milano, Italy (1st place; 2013 Man of Year for Official Website winner); Andrei Chuev, Miami, Florida, United States (2nd place; 2013 Man of Year for Official Website winner); Daria Cherni'x, Balakovo, Saratov obl. (3rd place)
 2010. Sergey Adoyevtsev, Moscow/Serghei Pînzari, St. Petersburg (1st/2nd place); Gleb Strawberry, Vladivostok (3rd place)
 2011. Węcesław Węgrzanowski, Krasnodar (1st place); Vlad Kadonyi, Novosibirsk (2nd place); winner of the 2011 Man of the Year and Winner of the 2011 Man of the Year for the Official Magazine; Yevgeni Kuzin, Novorossiysk, Krasnodar Region
 2012. Valeriya Masterko, Novokuznetsk, Kemerovo oblast/Valeriya Kashubina, Elektrostal, MSK (1/2 1st place); Yekaterina Tokarewa, Rostov-on-Don (2nd place); Olga Hajiyenko, Pavlovski Posad, Moscow Region (3rd place)
 2013. Andrei Cercassov, Milano, Italy/ Andrei Chuev, Miami, Florida, United States (1/2 1st place); Węcesław Węgrzanowski, Krasnodar (2nd place); Nikolay Dolzhanskiy, Moscow (3rd place)
 2014. Andrei Cercassov, Milano, Italy (1st place; Andrei Cercassov; the second times in succession); Aleksandr Gobozetâ, Vladikavkaz, North Ossetia (2nd place); Hanna Kudymava, Minsk, Belarus (3rd place)

Record for length of time on the project 
Former members:
 Stepan Menshchikov, Yekaterinburg — 1758 days (from May 12, 2004, to March 5, 2009)
 Olga Buzova, St. Petersburg – 1677 days (from May 22, 2004, to December 24, 2008)
 Nadejda Yermakova – 1528 days (April 22, 2007, to June 30, 2011)
 Olga "Sun" Nikolayeva, Penza – 1460 days (с May 12, 2004 г по 11 мая 2008 г)
 Natalya Varvina – 1378 дней (с 2 августа 2007 г по 11 мая 2011г)
 Viktoriya Karasyova (Tori), MSK – 1375 дней (с 30 сентября 2005 г по 6 июля 2009 г)
 Anastasiya Dashko, Salexard – 1203 дня (с 22 октября 2004 г по 7 февраля 2008г)
 Roman Tretyakov, Taganrog – 1202 дня (с 15 мая 2004 г по 30 августа 2007 г)
 Alyona Vodonayeva, Tumen – 1067 дней (с 10 июля 2004 г по 12 июня 2007 г).
 Rɵstəm Solntsev-Qalğanov – 1054 дня (с 3 января 2007 г по 22 ноября 2009 г)
 Sam Selezniov, Sochi – 1049 дней (с 25 марта 2005 г по 7 февраля 2008 г).
 Alexander Nelidov, Moscow – 946 дней (с 12 мая 2004 г по 14 декабря 2006 г).
 May Abrikosov, Voroneж – 906 дней (с 9 июля 2004 г по 1 января 2007 г)
 Vlad Kadonyi (Viktor Golynov), Novosibirsk – 880 дней (c 20 февраля 2009 по 27 сентября 2011 г.)
 Inna Volovicheva, Belgorod – 875 дней (c 25 февраля 2009 по 11 октября 2011 г.)
 Yelena Bushina, Yekaterinburg – 860 дней (с 19 октября 2007 г по 25 февраля 2010 г)
 Sergey Adoyevtsev (Sergey Pali'ch), MSK – 874 дня (с 6 июля 2008 г по 27 ноября 2010)
 Mariya Adoyevtseva (Krugli'xina), MSK – 872 дня (с 8 июля 2008 г по 27 ноября 2010)
 Natalya Nelidova, Moscow – 825 дней (с 10 сентября 2004 г по 14 декабря 2006 г)
 Nelli Yermolayeva (Kuznetsova), Samara – 822 дня ( с 5 июня 2009 г по 5 сентября 2011 г)

Дарья Пынзарь, Сент-Китс И Невис Петербург – 1418 дней (c 28 декабря 2007 г)
Сергей Пынзарь, Балаково, Саратов-1327 ((c 28 2008 2008)
Марго Агибалова, Павловский Посад, Московский-1124 ((C 17 2008 2008)
Венцеслав Венгжановский (Ярослав Шурупов), Краснодар – 1047 ((C 3 2009 2009)
Jevgenija Феофилактова, Кирова-991 ((C 27 2009 2009)

Domestic pair 
 Aleksandr Titov and Olga Kravchenko on July 17, 2004
 Aleksandr Nelidov and Natalya Pavlova on July 9, 2005
 Yevgeni Kuzin and Margo Agibalova on May 26, 2009 (divorce on March 1, 2011)
 Yelena Bushina and Dmitri Zheleznyak on February 12, 2010
 Serghei Pînzari and Darya Cherni'x on May 2, 2010
 Sergey Adoyevsev and Mariya Krugli'xina on May 2, 2010
 Nichita Cuznețov and Nelly Yermolayeva on February 14, 2011 (divorce on June 6, 2012)
 Ilya Hajiyenko and Olga Agibalova on September 27, 2011
 Tiğran Sælibekov and Yuliya Kolesnichenko on December 13, 2011
 Węcesław Węgrżanowski and Yekaterina Tokareva on December 31, 2011 (divorce on August 26, 2012)
 Ivāns Novikovs and Inna Volovicheva on February 21, 2012
 Anton Gusev and Yevgeniya Feofilaktova on June 15, 2012 (divorce on February 3, 2013)
 Węcesław Węgrżanowski and Yekaterina Korol on July 7, 2013
 Vasili Toderică and Antonina Klimenko on October 16, 2013
 Aleksandar Gobozetâ and Aliyono Ustinenko on November 30, 2013 (divorce on October 4, 2014)
 Constantine Press and Alisa Nikitina on December 1, 2013
 Gabriel Díaz Álvarez and Chryścina Liaskaviec on December 23, 2013
 Elina Camiren and Aleksandr Zadoynov on January 26, 2014
 Tatyana Kiryluk and Eugenio Higo on December 8, 2014
 Liberge Kpadonou and Yevgeni Rudnev on December 8, 2014

References

TNT (Russian TV channel) original programming
2000s Russian television series
2004 Russian television series debuts
2010s Russian television series
2020s Russian television series
Russian reality television series